The Cape Verde national basketball team represents Cape Verde in international basketball matches and is administered by the Federação Cabo-verdiana de Basquetebol.

Its greatest accomplishment was the bronze medal at the AfroBasket 2007, where Cape Verde beat Egypt in its last game.

On 26 February 2023, Cape Verde qualified for their first-ever World Cup when they claimed their ticket to the 2023 FIBA Basketball World Cup. The country became the smallest nation to ever qualify for a World Cup, breaking a record that was held by Montenegro.

Achievements
Bronze medal at the 2006 Lusophony Games
Bronze medal at the AfroBasket 2007
Silver medal at the 2009 Lusophony Games

Competitive record

FIBA World Cup

AfroBasket
 Third place   Fourth place

African Games

2011 – 6th

Lusophony Games

2006 – 
2009 – 
2014 – 4th

Team

Current roster
Roster for the AfroBasket 2021.

Depth chart

Head coach position
  Emanuel Trovoada – 2007
  Eric Silva – 2008
  Alex Nwora – 2009–2013
  Antonio Tavares – 2014
  Luis Magalhães – 2015
  Emanuel Trovoada – 2016–present

Past rosters
Team for the 2013 FIBA Africa Championship.

Kit

Manufacturer
2015 – Peak

Sponsor
2015 – Zap

See also
 Cape Verde women's national basketball team

References

External links
FIBA profile

Videos
 Cote d'Ivoire v Cape Verde – Game Highlights – Group D – AfroBasket 2015 Youtube.com video

Cape Verde
Basketball
Basketball teams in Cape Verde
Basketball
1988 establishments in Cape Verde